Bhavanisagar Dam or Lower Bhavani Dam, is located in Erode district, Tamil Nadu, India. The dam is constructed on the Bhavani river. It is one of the world's largest earthen dams.

History
The Lower Bhavani Project was the first major irrigation project initiated in India, after independence, in 1948. It was completed by 1955 and opened for use in 1956.

Dimensions

Hydrography
Bhavanisagar dam is constructed on the Bhavani River. The dam receives water from two main catchment areas in the Western Ghats. The water is fed into the Bhavani river known as Upper Bhavani. The eastern catchment area includes the Upper Bhavani, Avalanche and Emerald lakes, Kundha, Gedhai, Pillur and Nellithurai . The western catchment area includes Portimund, Parson's valley, Pykara, Glenmorgan, Chinkara, Maravakandy, Moyar and Thengumarahatta. The dam is fed by both Southwest and Northeast monsoons.

The dam feeds water into two canals, Lower Bhavani Project Canal and Kalingarayan Canal. The Kalingarayan canal feeds Thadapalli and Arakkankottai channels and the LBP canal feeds the Thadapalli and Arakankottai channels.

Power generation
The dam has two hydroelectric power stations, one on the east bank canal and the other on the Bhavani river.

See also 
 List of dams and reservoirs in India

References

Dams in Tamil Nadu
Dams completed in 1955
Buildings and structures in Erode district
Earth-filled dams
Hydroelectric power stations in Tamil Nadu
20th-century architecture in India